Elections to Reading Borough Council took place on 22 May 2014, with 15 council seats up for election. The Labour Party repeated their wins of 2012 gaining Church, Katesgrove, Redlands, Kentwood and Caversham wards, giving them a total of 31 Councillors. The Conservative Party lost three seats but gained Peppard ward from an independent. The Liberal Democrats lost two seats but held Tilehurst ward. The Green Party held Park ward including a by-election caused by the resignation of one of their Councillors. UKIP stood a record number of candidates at the election but failed to gain any council seats.

The elections were held on the same day as the 2014 European Elections.

After the election, the composition of the council was:

Election result

 

Note: The figures above for votes and vote percentages do not include the Park by-election.

Ward results

References
Abbey Ward Results 2014
Battle Ward Results 2014
Caversham Ward Results 2014
Church Ward Results 2014
Katesgrove Ward Results 2014
Kentwood Ward Results 2014
Minster Ward Results 2014
Norcot Ward Results 2014
Park Ward Results 2014
Park Ward By-Election Results 2014
Peppard Ward Results 2014
Redlands Ward Results 2014
Southcote Ward Results 2014
Thames Ward Results 2014
Tilehurst Ward Results 2014
Whitley Ward Results 2014

2014 English local elections
2014
2010s in Berkshire